Christian Erasmus Otterstrøm (Otterström) Jensen (1859–1941) was a Danish pharmacist and botanist, for decades a leading bryologist in Scandinavia. He studied botany and pharmaceutics at the University of Copenhagen and the Pharmaceutical College in Copenhagen. For the better part of his adult life, he ran a pharmacy in Hvalsø, Denmark, while devoting all available time to the study of mosses.

Selected works
Jensen, C. (1885)  Novaia Zemlia,  Th. Holm. In: . Copenhagen.
Jensen, C. (1915–1923) . Copenhagen, Gyldendalske Boghandel/Nordisk Forlag.
1. Hepaticales, Anthocerotales og Sphagnales, 317 pp.
2. Andreæales og Bryales, 569 pp.
 Jensen, C. (1909)  Kungliga Svenska Vetenskapsakademiens Handlingar, Vol. 44, No. 5.  
 Jensen, C. (1939) . Copenhagen.

Sources
Paulsen, Ove (1941) Til Minde om Bryologen C. Jensen. Naturens Verden 1941.  

19th-century Danish botanists
Bryologists
1941 deaths
1859 births
People from Lejre Municipality
20th-century Danish botanists